Q100 may be:
Quran 100 the 100th chapter of the Islamic Holy book
 De Havilland Canada Dash 8 Q100 turboprop, now by Bombardier Aerospace
 Q100, a conventional notation for the 100-year flood, particularly in hydrology

Transportation
 Q100 New York City bus

US radio stations
 WWWQ, a radio station (99.7 FM) in Atlanta, Georgia, United States.
 KXQQ-FM, a radio station (Q100.5 FM) in Henderson, Nevada, United States.
 WQON, a radio station (100.3 FM) in Grayling, Michigan, United States.
 WODE-FM, a radio station (99.9 FM) in Easton, Pennsylvania, United States, known as Q100 (WQQQ) from 1983 until 1989.
 WQPD, a radio station (Q100.5 FM) in Marion, South Carolina, United States.
 WBGQ, a radio station (Q100.7 FM) in Morristown, Tennessee, United States.
 WJTQ, a radio station (100.7 FM) in Pensacola, Florida, United States, known as Q100 from the mid-1970s until 1993.
 KRWQ, a radio station (Q100.3 FM) in Gold Hill, Oregon, United States.
 WQON, a radio station (Q100.3 FM) in Grayling, Michigan, United States.

Other radio stations
Q 100.7 FM, a radio station (100.7 FM) in the Barbados.